Burrinjuck is a village community in the far eastern part of the Riverina. It is situated by road, about 15 kilometres southwest from Woolgarlo and 28 kilometres south from Bookham. The name of the town is derived from an Aboriginal word meaning 'mountain with a rugged top'.

The village is situated on the western side of Burrinjuck Dam which holds water from the Murrumbidgee River and which was constructed between 1907 and 1928 (with World War I interfering with the timing of the construction).

During the construction of the dam and in the time during which it filled, there was a settlement known as 'Barren Jack City' facing the river at the base of the Burrinjuck mountain. Much of its site was later submerged as the dam water rose.

The locality of Burrinjuck includes part of one of the proposed sites for Australia's national capital, which was known as Mahkoolma. It was to be located in the upper reaches of nearby Carrolls Creek,

Barren Jack Post Office opened on 23 May 1907, was renamed Burrinjuck in 1911, and closed in 1979.

Heritage listings 
Burrinjuck has a number of heritage-listed sites, including:

 Barren Jack Creek Water Supply Dam
 Burrinjuck Dam
 Greater Burrinjuck Dam Site

Climate

Located on the exposed western slopes of the Brindabella Range, rainfall peaks distinctly in winter. Snow is a rare occurrence at the bottom of the valley, but it does occur annually on the surrounding ranges and hilly country above 600 metres (such as at Wee Jasper); nearby Black Andrew Mountain (935 metres) and Mount Barren Jack (972 metres) overlooking the lake, can be periodically snow-capped during the winter months.

References

 
Yass Valley Council
Towns in New South Wales
Southern Tablelands